Mika Hoshino (born 10 July 1965) is a former international table tennis player from Japan.

Table tennis career
She won a silver medal for Japan at the 1983 World Table Tennis Championships in the Corbillon Cup (women's team event) with Emiko Kanda, Fumiko Shinpo and Tomoko Tamura.

Mika participated in two Olympic Games in 1988 and 1992.

See also
 List of World Table Tennis Championships medalists

References

1965 births
Living people
Japanese female table tennis players
Asian Games medalists in table tennis
Table tennis players at the 1986 Asian Games
Medalists at the 1986 Asian Games
Asian Games bronze medalists for Japan
World Table Tennis Championships medalists
Olympic table tennis players of Japan
Table tennis players at the 1988 Summer Olympics
Table tennis players at the 1992 Summer Olympics
20th-century Japanese women
21st-century Japanese women